Stéphane Pierre (born 12 October 1981) is a Mauritian footballer who plays as a midfielder for Petite Rivière Noire SC in the Mauritian League and for the Mauritius national football team.

Career
Pierre has spent his entire career playing for Petite Rivière Noire SC in the Mauritian League, beginning in 2006. He won the Mauritian Cup with PRNSC in 2007.

International career
Pierre received his first cap for Mauritius in the 2007 COSAFA Cup against South Africa as a halftime substitute. He made his return to international football in a 2014 CHAN qualifier for Mauritius against Comoros in 2012, at the age of 31. During the 2013 COSAFA Cup, Pierre scored 3 goals for Mauritius to finish as the 2nd top scorer in the tournament.

References

Living people
1981 births
Mauritian footballers
Mauritius international footballers
Petite Rivière Noire FC players
Association football midfielders
Mauritian Premier League players